Thouinidium is a genus of flowering plants belonging to the family Sapindaceae.

Its native range is from Mexico to Central America (within the countries of Belize, Costa Rica, Dominican Republic, El Salvador, Guatemala, Haiti, Honduras and Nicaragua). 

The genus name of Thouinidium is in honour of André Thouin (1747–1824), a French botanist. 
It was first described and published in Sitzungsber. Math.-Phys. Cl. Königl. Bayer. Akad. Wiss. München Vol.8 on page 267 in 1878.

Known species
As accepted by Kew:
Thouinidium cyrilli-nelsonii 
Thouinidium decandrum 
Thouinidium inaequilaterum 
Thouinidium insigne 
Thouinidium oblongum 
Thouinidium pinnatum 
Thouinidium pulverulentum

References

Sapindaceae
Sapindaceae genera
Plants described in 1878
Flora of Mexico
Flora of Central America